Erik Larsen (born 1962), American comic book creator.

Erik Larsen may also refer to:

 Erik Larsen (rower) (1928–1952), Danish rower
 Erik Larsen (tennis), Danish Olympic tennis player
 Erik Otto Larsen (1931–2008), Danish novelist
 Eirik Verås Larsen (born 1976), Norwegian sprint kayaker
 Eric Larsen (explorer) (born 1971, American Polar adventurer

See also
Erik Larson (disambiguation)
Erik Larsson (disambiguation)